"Love Story" is a song by American singer-songwriter Taylor Swift. It was released as the lead single from her second studio album, Fearless, on September 15, 2008, by Big Machine Records. Inspired by a boy who was unpopular with her family and friends, Swift wrote the song using William Shakespeare's tragedy Romeo and Juliet as a reference point. The lyrics narrate a troubled romance that ends with a marriage proposal, contrary to Shakespeare's tragic conclusion. Produced by Swift and Nathan Chapman, the midtempo country pop includes a key change after the bridge and uses acoustic instruments including banjo, fiddle, mandolin, and guitar.

At the time of its release, music critics praised the production but deemed the literary references ineffective. In retrospect, critics have considered it one of Swift's best singles. "Love Story" peaked atop the chart in Australia, where it was certified ten-times platinum by the Australian Recording Industry Association (ARIA), and reached the top five on charts in Canada, Ireland, Japan, New Zealand, Scotland, and the UK. In the U.S., the single peaked at number four on the Billboard Hot 100 and was the first country song to reach number one on the Mainstream Top 40. The Recording Industry Association of America (RIAA) certified it eight-times platinum. "Love Story" has sold over six million copies in the U.S. and 18 million copies worldwide.

Trey Fanjoy directed the accompanying music video, which stars Swift and Justin Gaston, who appear as lovers in a prior era, drawing from historical periods such as the Renaissance and the Regency era; it won Video of the Year at both the Country Music Association Awards and CMT Music Awards in 2009. The song became a staple in Swift's live concerts and was part of the set lists in all of her headlining tours from the Fearless Tour (2009–2010) to the Reputation Stadium Tour (2018). Following the 2019 dispute regarding the ownership of Swift's back catalog, she re-recorded the song and released it as "Love Story (Taylor's Version)" in February 2021. The re-recorded single topped the Hot Country Songs chart, making Swift the second artist after Dolly Parton to reach number one with both the original and re-recorded versions of a song.

Background and writing

American singer-songwriter Taylor Swift relocated from Pennsylvania to Nashville, Tennessee, in 2004 to pursue a career as a country music artist, and in 2006, she released her self-titled debut album at 16 years old. The album spent more weeks on the U.S. Billboard 200 chart than any other album that was released in the 2000s decade. Taylor Swift third single "Our Song" made Swift the youngest person to single-handedly write and sing a Hot Country Songs number-one single. Her success was rare for a female teenage artist; the 2000s country-music market had been dominated by adult male musicians.

While promoting her debut album on tour in 2007 and 2008, Swift wrote songs for her second studio album Fearless. She developed "Love Story" late into the production of Fearless. Answering fan questions on Time in April 2009, Swift said the song was inspired by a boy whom she never dated and was one of the most romantic pieces she had written. Swift recalled the reactions she received after introducing him to her family and friends: "[They] all said they didn't like him. All of them!" This made Swift relate to the narrative of William Shakespeare's 16th-century play Romeo and Juliet, which she described as a "situation where the only people who wanted them to be together were them". Reflecting on the event, Swift thought; "This is difficult but it's real, it matters"; she developed the second refrain, and later the whole song, around that line.

Although inspired by Romeo and Juliet, Swift felt the play could have been "the best love story ever told" had it not been for the tragic ending in which the two characters die. She thus made the narrative of "Love Story" conclude with a marriage proposal, which she deemed a happy ending the characters deserved. Swift wrote "Love Story" on her bedroom floor in approximately 20 minutes, feeling too inspired to put the song down unfinished. According to Swift, the song represents her optimistic outlook on love, which is inspired by her childhood fascination with fairy tales. Looking back on "Love Story" after she released her seventh studio album Lover (2019), which is about her first experience of "love that was very real", Swift said the track is "stuff I saw on a movie, like Shakespeare, like stuff I read mixed in with some like crush stuff that had happened in my life".

Production and release

After finishing writing, Swift recorded a rough demo of "Love Story" within 15 minutes the next day. She recorded the song's album version in March 2008 with producer Nathan Chapman at Blackbird Studios in Nashville. For her vocals, Chapman tried different microphones until Swift came across an Avantone CV-12 multi-pattern tube microphone that was built by country-music artist Ray Kennedy, with whom she worked on Taylor Swift. After growing fond of the Avantone CV-12 upon testing her vocals, Swift used it to record "Love Story" and other songs. She sang the song live backed by her band, who were playing acoustic guitar, bass guitar, and drums. Chapman played other instruments, including nine acoustic guitars, and overdubbed them on the track; he also recorded background vocals.

Record engineer Chad Carlson recorded the track using Pro Tools and Justin Niebank mixed it using Solid State Logic 9080 K series and Genelec 1032 consoles. Drew Bollman and Richard Edgeler assisted in the mixing process. "Love Story", along with the rest of Fearless, was mastered by Hank Williams at MasterMix Studios in Nashville. The track uses country-music instruments such as banjo and fiddle. Big Machine Records released it to U.S. country radio as Fearless lead single on September 15, 2008. Chapman mixed another version of "Love Story" for pop radio; he edited Nielbank's mix using Apple Logic, and muted the acoustic instruments such as banjo and fiddle. The pop-radio version has an opening beat  that was generated using Apple Logic's Ultrabeat, and the electric guitars were created with Amplitube Stomp I/O. Rolling Stone Keith Harris described the electric guitars as "suitably gargantuan" and louder than those on the country-radio version. Big Machine in partnership with Republic Records released "Love Story" to U.S. pop radio on October 14, 2008.

Music and lyrics

"Love Story" is a midtempo country pop song that is driven by acoustic instruments including banjo, fiddle, mandolin, and guitar. Critic Jon Bream from the Star Tribune described the single as "pure pop with a minimalist vibe" that suits both country and pop radio. According to The New York Times, despite the banjo and fiddle, the song could "easily be an emo rocker". Swift's vocals have a slight twang. The mix and master, according to Billboard Kristen He, are loud and "dynamically flat ... [and are] designed to burst out of FM radio speakers".

The lyrics of "Love Story" narrate a troubled romance between two characters, drawing from the lead characters in Shakespeare's Romeo and Juliet. According to psychologist Katie Barclay, the song explores feelings of love in the contexts of pain and joy. "Love Story", save for the final refrain, is narrated from Juliet's perspective. In the verses, Juliet tells the story of hers and Romeo's challenged courtship, of which her father disapproves. The first verse introduces Juliet in a scene; "We were both young when I first saw you / I close my eyes and the flashback starts, I'm standing there / On a balcony in summer air", referencing the balcony scene in Act II, scene ii of Shakespeare's play. In the refrains, which alter slightly as the song progresses to accompany the narrative, Juliet pleads for her love interest to appear; "Romeo, take me somewhere we can be alone / I'll be waiting / All there's left to do is run".

In the second verse, Juliet meets Romeo again in a garden and learns he must leave town because of her father's disapproval. Their relationship encounters difficulties; "'Cause you were Romeo, I was a scarlet letter", referencing Nathaniel Hawthorne's The Scarlet Letter (1850). According to media-and-film scholar Iris H. Tuan, Hawthrone's "scarlet letter" imagery represents the female protagonist Hester Prynne's sin and adultery, whereas Swift's use symbolizes the forbidden love between Romeo and Juliet. Juliet pleads; "This love is difficult, but it's real", which Swift said was her favorite lyric in the song.

After the bridge, with accelerated drums and the harmonization of melody and vocals, the final refrain incorporates a key change up a whole step. The final refrain is narrated from Romeo's perspective, and tells of his marriage proposal to Juliet after he has sought her father's approval; "I talked to your dad, go pick out a white dress." Whereas Shakespeare's Romeo and Juliet are secretly married without their parents' approval and both commit suicide, the characters in "Love Story" depart from that tragic ending. According to Tuan, by projecting her feelings and fantasy on a Romeo and Juliet-inspired narrative, Swift created a song that strongly resonates with an audience of teenage girls and young women. Journalist Deborah Evans Price of Billboard agreed, but also said "one doesn't have to be a lovestruck teen" to enjoy the song's emotional engagement.

Critical reception
Blender included "Love Story" at number 73 on its 2008 year-end list, and The Village Voice Pazz & Jop critics' poll placed it at number 48. In Fearless reviews, many critics complimented the production; Sean Daly from the St. Petersburg Times, Rob Sheffield from Blender and Stephen Thomas Erlewine from AllMusic selected the track as an album highlight. Deborah Evans Price of Billboard praised the "swirling, dreamy" production and said Swift's success in the country-music market "could only gain momentum". Others including The Boston Globe James Reed and USA Today Elysa Gardner deemed "Love Story" an example of Swift's songwriting abilities at a young age; the latter appreciated the song for earnestly portraying teenage feelings "rather than [being] a mouthpiece for a bunch of older pros' collective notion of adolescent yearning".

Some critics were more reserved in their praise, taking issue with the literary references. In a four-stars-out-of-five rating of the song for the BBC, Fraser McAlpine deemed the Shakespearean reference not as sophisticated as its premise and the lyrics generic, but praised the production and wrote; "It's great to see a big pop song being used as a method of direct story telling". Musicologist James E. Perone commented; "the melodic hooks are strong enough to overcome the predictability of the lyrics". Jon Bream from the Star Tribune deemed the single inferior to Swift's debut country-music single "Tim McGraw" (2006) but commended the production as catchy. In a Slant Magazine review, Jonathan Keefe was impressed by Swift's melodic songwriting for creating "massive pop hooks", but found the references to Romeo and Juliet "point-missing" and The Scarlet Letter "inexplicable". Keefe deemed the lyrics lacking in creativity and disapproved of Swift's "clipped phrasing" in the refrain.

In a retrospective review, English-language professor Robert N. Watson deemed "Love Story" evidence of Swift's status as "the twenty-first-century's most popular songwriter of failed love affairs", specifically due to the Shakespearean narrative. Critics have rated "Love Story" high in rankings of Swift's songs; these include Hannah Mylrea from NME (2020), who ranked it fifth out of 160 songs, Jane Song from Paste (2020), 13th out of 158, and Nate Jones from Vulture (2021), who ranked it ninth out of 179. In another ranking of Swift's select 100 tracks for The Independent, Roisin O'Connor placed "Love Story" at number 15, saying it showcases Swift as a songwriter who "understands the power of a forbidden romance". Alexis Petridis from The Guardian placed it second, behind "Blank Space" (2014), on his 2019 ranking of Swift's 44 singles; he said of the literary references; "[If] the references to Shakespeare and Hawthorn seem clumsy, they are clumsy in a believably teenage way". The song was included on best-of lists including Taste of Country Top 100 Country Songs (2016), Time Out 35 Best Country Songs of All Time (2022), and Billboard Top 50 Country Love Songs of All Time (2022).

Commercial performance

In the U.S., "Love Story" debuted at number 16 on the Billboard Hot 100 and at number 25 on the Hot Country Songs chart, both dated September 27, 2008. The next week, it reached number five on the Hot 100. The single peaked at number four on the Hot 100 chart dated January 17, 2009, and spent 49 weeks on the chart. It spent two weeks atop the Hot Country Songs chart. On the Mainstream Top 40 (Pop Songs) chart, which tracks U.S. pop radio, "Love Story" reached number one on the week ending February 28, 2009, becoming the first song to top both the country-radio and pop-radio charts, and surpassed the number-three-peaking "You're Still the One" (1998) by Shania Twain as the highest-charting country crossover to pop radio.

On other Billboard airplay charts, "Love Story" peaked at number one on Adult Contemporary and number three on Adult Pop Songs. Together with "Teardrops on My Guitar" (2007), "Love Story" made Swift the first artist in the 2000s decade to have two titles each reach the top 10 of four airplay charts; Hot Country Songs, Mainstream Top 40, Adult Pop Songs, and Adult Contemporary. It topped the 2009 year-end Radio Songs chart. By February 2009, with three million downloads sold, it was the all-time best-selling country single. In 2015, the Recording Industry Association of America (RIAA) certified "Love Story" eight-times platinum, and the song had sold 6.2 million copies in the U.S. by October 2022, becoming Swift's highest-selling single in the nation.

"Love Story" was Swift's first number-one single in Australia, where it was certified ten-times platinum. It peaked within the top five of singles charts in Japan (three); and Anglosphere countries including the UK (two), Ireland (three), New Zealand (three), Canada (four), and Scotland (five). In mainland Europe, the single peaked at number ten on the European Hot 100 Singles chart, number four in the Czech Republic, number six in Hungary, number seven in Norway, and number ten in Sweden. "Love Story" was certified double platinum in Canada and the UK, platinum in New Zealand, and gold in Denmark and Japan. It was the sixth-most-downloaded single of 2009 worldwide, selling 6.5 million digital copies. By February 2021, estimated worldwide sales of "Love Story" stood at 18 million units.

Music video

Development and filming

Trey Fanjoy, who had worked with Swift on previous music videos, directed "Love Story". Swift was inspired by historical eras such as the Middle Ages, the Renaissance, and the Regency to make a period-piece-styled video with a timeless narrative that "could happen in the 1700s, 1800s, or 2008". She spent six months searching for the male lead and upon recommendation from an acquaintance chose Justin Gaston, a fashion model who was competing in the television series Nashville Star. After Gaston was eliminated from the show, Swift contacted him to appear in the video. She believed Gaston was a perfect choice for the male lead: "I was so impressed by the way his [expressions] were in the video. Without even saying anything, he would just do a certain glance and it really came across well."

The music video was filmed within two days in August 2008 in Tennessee. The crew considered traveling to Europe to find a castle for the video's setting but settled on Castle Gwynn in Arlington; the castle was built in 1973 and is part of the annual Tennessee Renaissance Festival. Wardrobe for the video—except Swift's dress for the balcony scene, which was designed by Sandi Spika with inspiration and suggestions from Swift—was supplied by Jacquard Fabrics, . On the first day, the balcony and field scenes were filmed. The second day's filming included the ballroom scene was filmed with 20 dancers from Cumberland University in Lebanon; Swift learned the choreography 15 minutes prior to filming. She invited some fans who were university students from other states to fly to Nashville and film the video with her. "Love Story" premiered on September 12, 2008, on CMT. Behind-the-scenes footage of the music video's production was aired on Great American Country on November 12, 2008.

Synopsis and commentary
The video starts with Swift wearing a black sweater and jeans; she walks through a college campus and sees Gaston reading under a tree. As they make eye contact, the video transitions to a balcony, on which Swift is wearing a corset and gown. The video switches to a ballroom where Gaston and Swift dance together, after which Gaston whispers into Swift's ear. Swift is next shown walking into a garden with a lantern at night. She meets with Gaston and they have a date before parting ways. Later, Swift again stands on the balcony looking out from the window. She sees Gaston running across a field towards her and she immediately runs down the staircase to meet him. The video then switches back to the modern-day college campus, where Gaston walks toward Swift and they gaze into each other's eyes, and the video ends.

Spin noted the video appears to have been filmed on an "HBO-looking budget" with "elaborate, pseudo-medieval set pieces"; according to the magazine, rather than alluding to Shakespeare's Romeo and Juliet, the narrative resembles "Rapunzel", especially the part in which Swift's character waits for her lover atop a castle. According to Glamour, Swift's fashion in the video reinforces the lyrical theme; "[She] literally wore a medieval ball gown while playing the Juliet to an actor's Romeo". In a 2010 Billboard interview, Swift reflected on the video's fairy-tale-inspired wedding setting: "I'm not really that girl who dreams about her wedding day. It just seems like the idealistic, happy-ever-after [moment]."

Awards and nominations
"Love Story" won Song of the Year at the Country Awards in 2009 and Pop Awards in 2010, both of which were held by Broadcast Music, Inc. (BMI) to honor the year's most-performed songs on U.S. radio and television. It marked Swift's second consecutive Song of the Year win at the BMI Country Awards, following "Teardrops on My Guitar" in 2008. Swift, who was 20, was the youngest songwriter to win Song of the Year at the BMI Pop Awards. At the Australian APRA Awards, "Love Story" was nominated for International Work of the Year.

It received nominations at the People's Choice Awards (Favorite Country Song, which went to Carrie Underwood's "Last Name"), Nickelodeon Australian Kids' Choice Awards (Favorite Song, which went to the Black Eyed Peas' "Boom Boom Pow"), and Teen Choice Awards (Choice Love Song, which went to David Archuleta's "Crush"). The music video was nominated for Video of the Year at the 45th Academy of Country Music Awards, but lost to Brad Paisley's "Waitin' on a Woman" (2008). At the 2009 CMT Music Awards, it won Video of the Year and Female Video of the Year. It also won Music Video of the Year at the 43rd Country Music Association Awards and Favorite International Video at the Philippine Myx Music Awards 2010.

Live performances and other usage

During promotion of Fearless in 2008 and 2009, Swift performed "Love Story" on television shows including Good Morning America, Late Show with David Letterman, The Today Show, Dancing with the Stars, The Ellen DeGeneres Show, and Saturday Night Live. At the 2008 Country Music Association Awards, she re-enacted the music video for "Love Story", performing the song on a ballroom stage-setting with Gaston playing the love interest. Swift and English band Def Leppard performed "Love Story", among other tracks from each artist's repertoire, for a CMT Crossroads episode that was recorded in October 2008; the performance was released on DVD in 2009. In the UK, Swift sang "Love Story" on the BBC charity telethon Children in Need, to which she donated £13,000 afterward.

"Love Story" was part of the set lists for many of Swift's 2009 headline festival performances, including Houston Livestock Show and Rodeo, Florida Strawberry Festival, Sound Relief, the CMA Music Festival, and Craven Country Jamboree. She included the song in the set list of her first headlining concert tour the Fearless Tour (2009–2010). The song's performances began with backup dancers dressed in Victorian clothing, dancing to Pachelbel's Canon as a castle backdrop was projected onto the stage. Swift emerged from below to an upper level of the stage; she wore an 18th-century-styled crimson gown with golden accents. For the final refrain, Swift hid behind backup dancers as she changed into a white wedding dress and a jeweled headband. The live performances of "Love Story" were recorded and released on the DVD Journey to Fearless in 2011.

"Love Story" was the final song on the set list of Swift's second headlining tour, the Speak Now World Tour (2011–2012). Swift wore a white sundress and sang the song while roaming across the stage on a flying balcony as confetti rained down and fireworks exploded on stage. The song was part of Swift's performance at BBC Radio 1's Teen Awards in October 2012; she appeared in a white dress before changing into silver hot pants and a sheer black top. Swift sang the song later the same month as part of a VH1 Storytellers episode that was recorded at Harvey Mudd College in California. On January 25, 2013, Swift performed an acoustic version of "Love Story" at the Los Premios 40 Principales in Spain. She again included the song in the set list of her third headlining tour the Red Tour (2013–2014), in which she sang it while wearing a white gown.

At the 2014 iHeartRadio Music Awards, Swift performed an arena rock version of "Love Story". During concerts of her fourth headlining tour the 1989 World Tour (2015), she rearranged the song as a synth-pop ballad and sang it while standing on an elevated platform that whisked around the venue. Commenting on the 1989 World Tour rearrangement, Jane Song from Paste said "Love Story" "will continue to be one of [Swift's] calling cards". Swift again included "Love Story" in the set list of her fifth concert tour, 2018's Reputation Stadium Tour, in which she performed it as part of a medley with her singles "Style" and "You Belong with Me".

On April 23, 2019, she performed a piano rendition of "Love Story" at Lincoln Center for the Performing Arts during the Time 100 Gala, in which she was honored as one of the year's "most influential people". On September 9, Swift performed the song at the City of Lover one-off concert in Paris. At the American Music Awards of 2019, at which she was awarded "Artist of the Decade", Swift performed "Love Story" as part of a medley with "The Man", "I Knew You Were Trouble", "Blank Space", and "Shake It Off". On July 21, 2022, at a concert of Haim's One More Haim Tour in London, Swift made a guest appearance and performed "Love Story" as part of a mashup with "Gasoline".

"Love Story" has been parodied and adapted into popular-culture events. For the 2009 CMT Music Awards, Swift and rapper T-Pain recorded a parody titled "Thug Story", in which they rap and sing with Auto-Tune; the parody aired as part of the awards ceremony's cold open. In August 2020, an unofficial house remix of "Love Story" by American DJ Disco Lines went viral on the video-sharing platform TikTok. The Disco Lines remix charted at number 37 on Poland's airplay chart in October 2020.

Personnel
Credits adapted from Fearless album liner notes:
 Taylor Swift – lead vocals, songwriter, producer, backing vocals
 Nathan Chapman – producer, backing vocals
 Drew Bollman – assistant mixer
 Chad Carslon – recording engineer
 Richard Edgeler – assistant recording engineer, assistant mixer
 Justin Niebank – mixer
 Tim Van der Kull – additional guitar
 Jeremy "Jim Bob" Wheatley – additional recording engineer, additional mixer
 Caitlin Evanson – backing vocals

Charts

Weekly charts

Year-end charts

Decade-end charts

All-time charts

Certifications

Release history

"Love Story (Taylor's Version)"

After signing a new contract with Republic Records, Swift began re-recording her first six studio albums, including Fearless, in November 2020. The decision came after a 2019 public dispute between Swift and talent manager Scooter Braun, who acquired Big Machine Records, including the masters of Swift's albums the label had released. By re-recording her catalog, Swift had full ownership of the new masters, including the copyright licensing of her songs, devaluing the Big Machine-owned masters.

Swift re-recorded "Love Story" and titled it "Love Story (Taylor's Version)". An excerpt of the re-recording was used in a Match.com advertisement in December 2020. "Love Story (Taylor's Version)" was the first re-recorded track she released; it was made available for download and streaming on February 12, 2021, preceding the release of the re-recorded album Fearless (Taylor's Version) in April. An EDM version of "Love Story (Taylor's Version)" remixed by Swedish producer Elvira was released on March 26, 2021, and was included on the deluxe edition of Fearless (Taylor's Version).

Production
"Love Story (Taylor's Version)" was produced by Swift and Nashville-based producer Christopher Rowe. It was recorded by David Payne at Black Bird Studios, with additional recording by Rowe at Prime Recording and Studio 13, all of which are in Nashville. Sam Holland recorded Swift's vocals at Conway Recording Studios in Los Angeles; Serban Ghenea mixed the re-recording at MixStar Studios in Virginia Beach, Virginia; and Randy Merrill mastered it at Sterling Sound in Edgewater, New Jersey. Swift invited some of the musicians who worked on the 2008 version to re-record with her; these participants include Jonathan Yudkin on fiddle, Amos Heller on bass guitar, and Caitlin Evanson on harmony vocals; they were part of Swift's touring band and had played "Love Story" with her many times.

According to critics, the production of "Love Story (Taylor's Version)" is faithful to that of the 2008 version. They noticed changes in the timbre of Swift's vocals, which have a fuller tone and an absence of the country-music twang; The Atlantic Shirley Li found Swift's voice "much richer" with a controlled tone and precise staccato. Swift said re-recording "Love Story" made her realize how she had improved as a singer and how her "voice was so teenaged" in the old recordings.

The re-recording's instruments are sharper and more distinct, with clearer sounds of the banjo, cymbals, and fiddle; stronger drums; a more-clearly defined bass; less-harsh electric guitars; and lowered harmonies in the mix. In Billboard, Kristen He said whereas the instruments on the 2008 version blend into a "wall of sound", the production of "Love Story (Taylor's Version)" highlights individual instruments.

Reception

In reviews, critics praised "Love Story (Taylor's Version)" for being faithful to the original version, and improving upon it with polished production and Swift's mature vocals. A few welcomed the re-recording as Swift's display of ownership of her music. Reviews from Rolling Stone's Simon Vozick-Levinson and Los Angeles Times Mikael Wood dubbed the re-recording an update of a "classic" song about teenage sentiments. Mark Savage from the BBC said Swift's improved vocals retain the teenage feelings, but The Atlantic Shirley Li and NME Hannah Mylrea said they were more powerful, which introduces a sense of wistfulness and therefore loses the earnestness of the 2008 version. According to Robert Christgau, "Swift's voice retains a great deal of freshness" but he questioned the value of her re-recording of early songs, saying he "can't imagine even so that I'd lay out money for the re-recordings".

In the U.S., "Love Story (Taylor's Version)" debuted atop the Hot Country Songs chart, giving Swift her eighth number-one single and first number-one debut. With this achievement, she became the first artist to lead the chart in the 2000s, 2010s, and 2020s, and the second artist to have a number one with both the original and re-recorded version of a song, after Dolly Parton with "I Will Always Love You". On other Billboard charts, "Love Story (Taylor's Version)" topped Digital Song Sales (Swift's record-extending 22nd number one), Country Digital Song Sales (record-extending 15th number one), and Country Streaming Songs. The song debuted and peaked at number 11 on the Billboard Hot 100, her record-extending 129th chart entry. The re-recording peaked at number seven on the Billboard Global 200. It reached the top 10 in Malaysia—where it peaked at number one; and in Canada, Ireland, and Singapore. Elsewhere, it charted in the top 20 in New Zealand, peaking at number 18; and at number 12 in the UK, where it was certified silver.

In October 2021, Billboard reported radio stations in the U.S. were not actively playing "Love Story (Taylor's Version)" because they deemed the re-recording indiscernible from the original, and due to inaction from Republic Records. At the 2022 CMT Music Awards, the re-recording won the inaugural Trending Comeback Song of the Year; CMT created the category to honor "iconic stars and their hits that not only stood the test of time but also recently found new popularity".

Credits and personnel
Album version

 Taylor Swift – lead vocals, songwriting, production
 Christopher Rowe – production, record engineering
 David Payne – record engineering
 John Hanes – engineering
 Randy Merrill – master engineering
 Serban Ghenea – mixing
 Sam Holland – vocal engineering
 Sean Badum – assistant recording engineering
 Mike Meadows – backing vocals, acoustic guitar, banjo, mandolin
 Paul Sidoti – backing vocals, electric guitar
 Caitlin Evanson – backing vocals
 Amos Heller – bass
 Matt Billingslea – drums
 Max Bernstein – electric guitar
 Jonathan Yudkin – fiddle

Elvira Remix

 Taylor Swift – lead vocals, songwriting, backing vocals
 Elvira Anderfjärd – production, remixing, backing vocals, bass, drums, keyboards, programming, recording engineering
 Christopher Rowe – vocal production
 John Hanes – engineering
 Randy Merrill – masters engineering
 Serban Ghenea – mixing
 Sam Holland – vocal engineering

Charts

Weekly charts

Year-end charts

Certifications

Release history

See also
List of best-selling singles
 List of best-selling singles in Australia
List of best-selling singles in the United States
List of number-one singles of 2009 (Australia)
List of Billboard Adult Contemporary number ones of 2009
List of Hot Country Songs number ones of 2008
List of Billboard Mainstream Top 40 number-one songs of 2009
 List of top 10 singles in 2021 (Ireland)
 List of Billboard number-one country songs of 2021

References

Cited sources

 

2008 songs
2008 singles
2021 singles
Taylor Swift songs
Music videos directed by Trey Fanjoy
Number-one singles in Australia
Songs written by Taylor Swift
Song recordings produced by Taylor Swift
Song recordings produced by Nathan Chapman (record producer)
Song recordings produced by Chris Rowe
Big Machine Records singles
Works based on Romeo and Juliet
Republic Records singles
Country pop songs